Edoardo Zardini can refer to:

 Edoardo Zardini (alpine skier) (born 1976), an Italian alpine skier
 Edoardo Zardini (cyclist) (born 1989), an Italian cyclist